The Muniz M-9 was a two-seat training biplane with tandem open cockpit and powered by a 200 hp (149 kW) 130 hp (197 kW) de Havilland Gipsy Six engine. Designed by Lieutenant-Colonel Antônio Muniz, a serving officer in the Brazilian Air Force, as an advanced trainer and was very similar to his earlier M-7 primary trainer. It was first flown in 1937 and a small production run was built for the air force by Companhia Nacional de Navegação Nacional.

Operators

Argentine Air Force

Brazilian Air Force

Paraguayan Air Force

Specifications (M-9)

See also

References

 
 
 

Muniz aircraft
1930s Brazilian civil trainer aircraft
1930s Brazilian military trainer aircraft
World War II military aircraft